Miguel Cabrera (born 1983) is a Venezuelan baseball player in Major League Baseball.

Miguel Cabrera may also refer to:

Miguel Cabrera (painter) (1695–1768), Mexican painter
Miguel Cabrera Cabrera (born 1948), Spanish architect and politician

See also
Cabrera (surname)